Sam Carter (born 10 September 1989) is an Australian rugby union player who plays lock for Ulster. He formerly played for the Brumbies from 2011 to 2019, and won 16 caps for Australia between 2014 and 2017.

His father, David Carter, was also an Australian international. He was educated at The Scots College in Sydney, and represented Sydney University. He moved to Canberra to join the Brumbies Academy in 2010. He made his debut for the Brumbies in 2011 against the Melbourne Rebels, and soon became a regular in the team. He was made co-captain with Christian Leali'ifano in 2017, and became only the twelfth Brumbies player to make 100 appearances in 2018. He played for the Canberra Vikings in the inaugural season of the National Rugby Championship in 2014. He joined the New South Wales Country Eagles for the 2015 season. He first played for Australia in 2014, and won the last of his sixteen caps in 2017, before falling out with coach Michael Cheika. He signed for Ulster ahead of the 2019–20 season, but missed most of his first season there with a shoulder injury. He has since captained the side.

Super Rugby statistics

References

External links
Ulster Rugby profile
United Rugby Championship profile

ESPN Profile
ItsRugby profile

1989 births
Living people
People educated at Scots College (Sydney)
Rugby union players from Sydney
Australian rugby union players
ACT Brumbies players
New South Wales Country Eagles players
Australia international rugby union players
Barbarian F.C. players
Rugby union locks
Canberra Vikings players
Ulster Rugby players
Australian expatriate sportspeople in Northern Ireland
Australian expatriate rugby union players
Expatriate rugby union players in Northern Ireland